Cynon may refer to:

Cynon Valley
 Cynon Valley, one of the South Wales Valleys
 River Cynon, the river which gives its name to the Cynon Valley
 Rhondda Cynon Taf, an administrative area in Wales created through the merger of the former districts of the Rhondda, Cynon Valley and Taff-Ely
 Cynon Valley (UK Parliament constituency), a UK constituency that serves the Cynon Valley
 Cynon Valley (Assembly constituency), a Welsh Assembly constituency that serves the Cynon Valley

People
 Cynon ap Clydno, a Welsh hero of Arthurian legend